Bulmahn is a surname. Notable people with the surname include:

 Edelgard Bulmahn (born 1951), German politician
 Jason Bulmahn (born 1976), American game designer
 Luna Bulmahn (born 1999), German athlete

See also
 Bulman (surname)